The 1937 Eastern Suburbs DRLFC season was the 30th in the club's history. They competed in the New South Wales Rugby Football League's 1937 Premiership, finishing the season in first place and winning their third consecutive premiership.

Ladder

References

External links
Rugby League Tables and Statistics

Sydney Roosters seasons
East